Francis Joseph Shakespeare (April 9, 1925 – December 14, 2022) was an American diplomat and media executive. He was the president of CBS before entering public service. He served as the United States ambassador to Portugal from 1985 to 1986 and the United States ambassador to the Holy See from 1986 to 1989. He later served as an honorary member of the board of trustees for The Heritage Foundation.

Early life and education
Born in New York City to Francis and Frances Shakespeare on April 9, 1925, and raised in the Catholic faith, Shakespeare graduated from the College of the Holy Cross in 1946 with a Bachelor of Science. He also served in the U.S. Navy from 1945 to 1946.

Career

Shakespeare was vice president of CBS in New York City from 1963 to 1965, then executive vice president from 1965 to 1967, when he was appointed by President Richard Nixon as director of the United States Information Agency.  After serving in this capacity from 1969-1973, he returned to the private sector as executive vice president of Westinghouse in New York. In 1975 he became vice chairman of RKO General.

In 1981 President Ronald Reagan named him chairman of the Board for International Broadcasting, the entity which oversaw the operations of Radio Free Europe. He held this position until 1985, when Reagan appointed him United States Ambassador to Portugal. The following year, in September 1986, Shakespeare was appointed United States Ambassador to the Holy See.

From 1979, Shakespeare was an honorary member of the board of trustees for The Heritage Foundation, a Washington, D.C.–based public policy research institute. He also served as a trustee of the Lynde and Harry Bradley Foundation of Milwaukee, Wisconsin.

Awards
Shakespeare was awarded honorary degrees in engineering from the Colorado School of Mines in 1975, in commercial science from Pace University in 1979, and in law from Sacred Heart University in 1985.

Personal life
Shakespeare was divorced and had one son and two daughters. He served the Catholic Church as a member of the Sovereign Military Order of Malta. He died on December 14, 2022, at age 97.

References

External links

1925 births
2022 deaths
Politicians from New York City
Businesspeople from New York City
Military personnel from New York City
Catholics from New York (state)
United States Information Agency directors
Ambassadors of the United States to Portugal
Ambassadors of the United States to the Holy See
Nixon administration personnel
Reagan administration personnel
George H. W. Bush administration personnel
New York (state) Republicans
Richard Nixon 1968 presidential campaign
American media executives
CBS executives
Westinghouse Electric Company
RKO General
Radio Free Europe/Radio Liberty people
The Heritage Foundation
College of the Holy Cross alumni
Knights of Malta
20th-century American diplomats
20th-century American businesspeople
21st-century American businesspeople